Selenogallates (or selenidogallates) are chemical compounds which contain anionic units of selenium connected to gallium. They can be considered as gallates where selenium substitutes for oxygen. Similar compounds include the thiogallates and selenostannates. They are in the category of chalcogenotrielates or more broadly chalcogenometallates.

Formation 
Selenogallates may be produced by heating a metal azide with gallium monoselenide and selenium in a sealed tube.

Selenogallates containing Se2 units are formed by heating with selenium. Conversely, by heating, extra selenium vapour can be lost forming a compound with less selenium.

Properties 
Most selenogallates are semiconductors. Their resistance drops on exposure to light. Also selenogallates are often coloured, most often red.

Selenogallate structures can include rings such as the four-membered ring: [] or the five-membered []. These can be linked into chains.

Use 
Selenogallates are primarily of research interest. They are being researched for photovoltaic cells where efficiencies over 20% are possible, and for photoconductors, and non-linear optical devices.

List

References

Gallium compounds
Selenides